Arne Petersen (2 April 1913 – 28 December 1990) was a Danish cyclist. He competed in the individual and team road race events at the 1936 Summer Olympics.

References

External links
 

1913 births
1990 deaths
Danish male cyclists
Olympic cyclists of Denmark
Cyclists at the 1936 Summer Olympics
People from Vejen Municipality
Sportspeople from the Region of Southern Denmark